Savoonga Airport  is a state-owned public-use airport located two nautical miles (4 km) south of the central business district of Savoonga, a city in the Nome Census Area of the U.S. state of Alaska. Savoonga is located on St. Lawrence Island in the Bering Sea.

Facilities 
It has one runway designated 5/23 with a 4,400 × 100 ft (1,341 × 30 m) gravel surface.

Airlines and destinations

Prior to its bankruptcy and cessation of all operations, Ravn Alaska served the airport from multiple locations.

References

External links 
 FAA Alaska airport diagram (GIF)
 

Airports in the Nome Census Area, Alaska
St. Lawrence Island